Cirilo Guainora   is a corregimiento in Cémaco District, Comarca Emberá, Panama with a population of 8,703 as of 2010. It is the seat of Cémaco District. It was created by Law 22 of November 8, 1983. Its population as of 1990 was 1,428; its population as of 2000 was 2,015.

References

Populated places in Comarca Emberá-Wounaan
Corregimientos of Comarca Emberá-Wounaan